Victor Dyrgall (October 8, 1917 – October 4, 2006) was an American long-distance runner. He competed in the marathon at the 1952 Summer Olympics.

References

External links
 

1917 births
2006 deaths
Athletes (track and field) at the 1952 Summer Olympics
American male long-distance runners
American male marathon runners
Olympic track and field athletes of the United States
Track and field athletes from New York City
20th-century American people